Colégio Santa Maria is a Catholic school founded in Metropolitan region of São Paulo, Brazil

In the past, it was a girls-only school. 

Website from school: 

Secondary schools in Brazil
1947 establishments in Brazil